Levchunovka is a rural locality (a selo) and the administrative center of Levchunovskoye Rural Settlement, Nikolayevsky District, Volgograd Oblast, Russia. The population was 1,005 as of 2010. There are 24 streets.

Geography 
Levchunovka is located on Transvolga, 26 km northeast of Nikolayevsk (the district's administrative centre) by road. Pioner is the nearest rural locality.

References 

Rural localities in Nikolayevsky District, Volgograd Oblast